Terry Luther Long (July 21, 1959 – June 7, 2005) was an American college and professional football player who was an offensive lineman in the National Football League (NFL) for eight seasons during the 1980s and early 1990s.  He played college football for East Carolina University, and thereafter he played professionally for the Pittsburgh Steelers.

Early years
Long was born in Columbia, South Carolina, to Levane Pickney and Robert Luther Long. He attended Eau Claire High School and graduated in 1977. One of his early jobs at the age of 14, he worked as a brick layer. After high school, Terry enlisted in the U.S. Army, and played football while stationed at Fort Bragg. Long was recruited from the military to play football for Columbia Junior College. While there, he studied for his degree in Business Administration. He'd later transfer to East Carolina, play football for that program, while still pursuing his degree. He was a four-year starter for the Pirates, and earned his degree.

College career
Long attended East Carolina University, where he played for the East Carolina Pirates football team from 1980 to 1983.  He was recognized as a consensus first-team All-American in 1983. While at college, Long was a four-year starter.

Professional career
During his eight NFL seasons, he played in 105 games, and started 89 of them. Long recorded three fumble recoveries and even returned a kick off during a game in 1984. As a rookie in 1984, Long started seven games, as the Steelers finished 9–7, winning the AFC Central, despite an unstable quarterback situation, with former first round selection Mark Malone and former Dolphins starter David Woodley splitting the starting duties. The next season the Steelers dipped to 7–9, and the quarterback situation did not improve, as both Malone and Woodley struggled, leading to second year pro Scott Campbell getting two starts at quarterback. That year Long played in 15 games and started 14 of them. In 1986, Long started all 16 games, but the Steelers were not winners on the field, falling to a record of 6–10. Malone continued to struggled and so did rookie Bubby Brister. Despite the ineffective quarterback play, Long had one of his best seasons. Long did not cross the picket line in 1987 when the players went on strike. In 1989, he only started in nine games, though he'd start in all 16 the following season. In 1991, his final season, he only started three games and dressed for eight.

Legal troubles
In the days leading up to his death, Long was facing a plethora of legal issues. Long had been indicted in March 2005 for arson and fraud charges from a fire that destroyed his chicken processing business. The fire occurred the same day he filed for Chapter 11 Bankruptcy Protection in 2003. Though investigators quickly figured out the fire was set intentionally, it took further investigation to learn of the financial reasons behind the fire. In addition to the charges stemming from the fire, Long also faced charges regarding loans he had received from the state that were supposed to be used to purchase processing equipment for his company. On top of the charges he was facing, his home was also in foreclosure proceedings. Long had already had troubles with the law after the July 1991 incident that occurred after Steelers coach Chuck Noll informed Long that he was being suspended by the NFL for failing a test for steroids; during the conversation, Long brandished a gun.

Death
Long died on June 7, 2005. It was determined that he had consumed a full gallon of antifreeze, which was ruled a suicide. An autopsy revealed that Long was diagnosed with CTE, a condition caused by his football career. His brain was examined by neuropathologist Bennet Omalu. He had previously attempted suicide in 1991, after testing positive for the NFL's steroid test.

Long was buried at the Swansea Methodist Church Cemetery in Swansea, South Carolina. One week before he died, Long approached the minister of his church, and asked if he could speak to the church goers about his legal issues that were about to make headlines. However, Long killed himself later that week.

References

1959 births
2005 deaths
All-American college football players
American football offensive guards
American football offensive tackles
American football players with chronic traumatic encephalopathy
East Carolina Pirates football players
Pittsburgh Steelers players
Players of American football from Columbia, South Carolina
Suicides by poison
Suicides in Pennsylvania
2005 suicides